The Pine School is a private school that serves students from kindergarten through grade 12 in Hobe Sound, Florida, United States.

History
The school was formally known as St. Michaels School.

Notable alumni
 Peg Parnevik - Swedish singer and songwriter

References

Private elementary schools in Florida
Private middle schools in Florida
Preparatory schools in Florida
High schools in Martin County, Florida
Stuart, Florida
Hobe Sound, Florida
Educational institutions established in 1969
Private high schools in Florida
1969 establishments in Florida